Wordster is an online language resource, that offers through its website dictionary, thesaurus, and other services for anyone learning about the English language. Much of the content in Wordster is automatically generated, and it applies a number of automated language processing and scalable data retrieval technologies in producing user output.

History
Wordster was founded by Anindya Datta, originally as a resource to help his daughter Diya learn the meanings of words in context. Anindya was subsequently joined by Jay Clark, his friend and former business partner. Wordster is a privately funded startup with offices and teams working in Atlanta, Georgia; Singapore; and Kolkata (Calcutta), India. The company employs individuals with backgrounds in computer science, languages, education, and lexicography.

Wordster features
User Contribution System: Users can create a profile and contribute content to the website. Their sentences, images, videos, and pronunciations are displayed when other users search for words.
 Multimedia Dictionary Entries: When you search for a word at Wordster, it provides definitions, sentences that demonstrate the word's meaning in context, pronunciations, images, word usage patterns, word origins, videos, and related words. Usage patterns and related words are conveniently illustrated in graphs and charts in an interactive visual thesaurus.
 Concept Mapper: When a user enters a concept, Wordster provides a list of words and phrases related to that concept, organized by part of speech. This feature can be used as a reverse dictionary, related words finder, trivia system, and research tool.
 Write Assist: Users can enter in any type of text and discover a variety of writing tips, including word frequency counts, repeated words, alternate word suggestions, and a usage analysis.

Technology
Wordster is a testbed for a number of scientific advances, such as the Lexical Crawler. The Lexical Crawler program "crawls" through websites, blogs, and other channels to find sample sentences for all the entries on Wordster. Over 1 million words have been identified from over 200 million documents that have been "crawled". To address one of the most difficult problems in the science of Natural Language Processing, Wordster has developed a system that allows for online semantic processing and recognition of words in context. All of this processing occurs in real time.

References
Gartner
TechDraw
National University of Singapore
AsiaOne

External links
 Wordster homepage

Online English dictionaries
American educational websites
Linguistics websites